William Oxley (born 1965) is a racing skipper/navigator and marine biologist who has completed more than 300,000 nm of ocean racing including five round the world races and 20 Sydney to Hobart races. From 1992 to 2000 he worked at the Australian Institute of Marine Science  as part of the Long-term Monitoring Project which is intended to monitor the condition of the Great Barrier Reef.

He skippered 'Compaq' in the BT Global Challenge 2000/01  and he was also the weather coordinator for the Swedish VICTORY Challenge America’s Cup Team. 
He provided navigation and weather support for Puma in the 2008/09 Volvo Ocean Race. For the 2011–12 Volvo Ocean Race he was navigator aboard Camper (Emirates Team New Zealand). Oxley was the navigator for Team Alvimedica in the 2014-15 Volvo Ocean Race.

He contributes to Australian Sailing magazine.

In 2014, Oxley published an e-book with Amazon titled Modern Race Navigation: Expedition Software in Action. In 2017, he published his second e-book "Expedition Navigation Software: A Gentle Introduction".

References

External links
 
 

1965 births
Living people
Australian male sailors (sport)
Volvo Ocean Race sailors
Team New Zealand sailors